Clathrina primordialis is a species of calcareous sponge from Croatia.

References

Clathrina
Invertebrates of Europe
Sponges described in 1872
Taxa named by Ernst Haeckel